Lena Urbaniak (born 31 October 1992 in Schwäbisch Gmünd) is a German athlete specialising in the shot put. She won the gold medal at the 2015 Summer Universiade.

Her personal bests in the event are 18.02 metres outdoors (Kassel 2016) and 18.32 metres indoors (Karlsruhe 2016).

In her youth she also competed in gymnastics, handball and karate.

Competition record

References

1992 births
Living people
Sportspeople from Stuttgart (region)
German female shot putters
Athletes (track and field) at the 2016 Summer Olympics
Olympic athletes of Germany
Universiade medalists in athletics (track and field)
Universiade gold medalists for Germany
Medalists at the 2015 Summer Universiade
Medalists at the 2017 Summer Universiade
20th-century German women
21st-century German women
People from Schwäbisch Gmünd